In October 2018, doctors in France demanded an investigation into why thirteen babies in three rural areas had been born without hands, forearms or arms in three rural areas, between 2007 and 2017. 

The public health authority initially stated that the incidents were not significantly higher than the national average, and they would not investigate further. However, after additional cases were reported, also in rural areas, health minister Agnès Buzyn launched a nationwide investigation into the causes in November 2018.  One of the affected areas was near the village of Druillat in Ain, where 18 babies were born with upper limb defects between 2000 and 2014.

Amelia (lack of one of more limbs) and meromelia (partial absence of one or more limbs) can have multiple causes, including chromosomal disorders, infection, or exposure to toxic substances at a critical time in the development of the embryo, between the 6th and 8th week, when the arms and legs appear.

An initial report was due in January 2019, with the full report expected .

References

Health disasters in France
2018 health disasters
2018 in France